Khor is a Census Town and Gram Panchayat in Jawad tehsil of Neemuch district, Madhya Pradesh. The total population as of 2011 was 5683.

The Nava Toran Temple is situated here.

References

Villages in Neemuch district